Oakwood Historic District is a national historic district located at Hickory, Catawba County, North Carolina. It includes work designed by architects Wheeler & Stearn. It encompasses 50 contributing buildings, 1 contributing site (Oakwood Cemetery), and 1 contributing structure in an upscale residential section of Hickory.  It includes notable examples of Colonial Revival, Bungalow / American Craftsman, and Queen Anne style architecture dating from the 1880s to 1930s.  Notable buildings include the Robert E. Simpson House (1922), Walker Lyerly House (1913), Cline-Wilfong House (1912), Abel A. Shuford, II House (c. 1905), Paul A. Setzer House (1927), John H. P. Cilley House (1912), (first) Charles H. Geitner House (1900), Benjamin F. Seagle House (c. 1907), David L. Russell House (c. 1908, 1914), Robert W. Stevenson House (c. 1896), Jones W. Shuford House (1907), Dr. Robert T. Hambrick House (1928), Alfred P. Whitener House (c. 1906), and J. Summie Propst House (1881-1883).

It was listed on the National Register of Historic Places in 1986, and enlarged in 2019.

References

Hickory, North Carolina
Houses on the National Register of Historic Places in North Carolina
Historic districts on the National Register of Historic Places in North Carolina
Queen Anne architecture in North Carolina
Colonial Revival architecture in North Carolina
Geography of Catawba County, North Carolina
Churches in Catawba County, North Carolina
National Register of Historic Places in Catawba County, North Carolina
Houses in Catawba County, North Carolina